God Is Good! is the first live album by American Christian musician Cody Carnes. It was released on September 30, 2022, via Sparrow Records and Capitol Christian Music Group. The album features guest appearances by Kari Jobe, Natalie Grant, and Benjamin William Hastings. The album was produced by Austin Davis, Aaron Robertson

God Is Good! was supported by the release of "Good (Can't Be Anything Else)" and "Ain't Nobody" as singles. "Good (Can't Be Anything Else)" peaked at No. 39 on the US Christian Airplay chart. "Ain't Nobody" peaked at No. 10 on the US Hot Christian Songs chart. "Forever & Amen" was released as a promotional single from the album. The album is also being promoted with the God Is Good! Tour, spanning eight cities across the United States in 2023.

The album debuted at No. 45 on Billboard'''s Top Christian Albums chart in the United States.

Background
In June 2022, Cody Carnes announced that he will be recording his first live album on July 7–8 at The Belonging Co in Nashville, Tennessee. On September 2, 2022, Carnes announced that he will be releasing his first live album, God Is Good!, on September 30, 2022.

Release and promotion
Singles
Carnes released "Good (Can't Be Anything Else)" accompanied with its live music video on August 19, 2022, as the lead single from the album. "Good (Can't Be Anything Else)" peaked at No. 42 on the US Christian Airplay chart.

On September 30, 2022, "Ain't Nobody" impacted Christian radio in the United States as the second single from the album. "Ain't Nobody" peaked at No. 22 on the US Hot Christian Songs chart.

Promotional singles
Cody Carnes released "Ain't Nobody" as the first promotional single from the album on September 2, 2022, accompanied with its music video.

Carnes released "Forever & Amen" with Kari Jobe as the second promotional single from the album, accompanied with its music video.

Critical reception

Timothy Yap, reviewing for JubileeCast, concluded in his review of the album: "In terms of recording techniques, budget, co-writers, and duet partners, Carnes has everything going for him. He just needs to work on his songs --- they need more hooks." Reviewing for Worship Leader, Christopher Watson said "All the tracts are solid. But some are truly special, bold, and full of energy that fuels the soul," concluding with the recommendation that "It would be great to see what Cody would do with more creative instrumentation, beyond the standard worship team rhythm section and vocal cast."

Touring
On October 10, 2022, Cody Carnes announced his first headlining tour, dubbed the God Is Good! Tour, joined by Benjamin William Hastings as a special guest and set to visit eight cities across the United States in 2023. The tour will commence at Desperation Church, Cullman, Alabama on February 8, 2023, concluding at The King's University in Dallas, Texas, on February 19, 2023.

Commercial performance
In the United States, God Is Good!'' debuted at No. 45 on the Top Christian Albums chart in the United States dated October 15, 2022.

Track listing
All tracks were produced by Aaron Robertson and Austin Davis except where stated.

Personnel
Credits adapted from AllMusic.

 Andria Alston — vocals
 Jacob Arnold — drums, percussion
 Jonathan Baines — choir/chorus
 Lorenzo Baylor — choir/chorus
 Tammy Beiswenger — vocals
 Hank Bentley — acoustic guitar, background vocals, electric guitar, Hammond organ, piano, producer, programming
 Chris Bevins — editing
 Alex Bivens — choir/chorus
 Cody Carnes — acoustic guitar, background vocals, percussion, piano, primary artist, vocals
 Jess Carpenter — choir/chorus
 Angelique Carter — choir/chorus
 Mike Cervantes — mastering engineer
 Chad Chrisman — A&R
 Amanda Cockrell — choir/chorus
 Marci Coleman — choir/chorus
 Austin Davis — Drums, Producer
 Garrett Davis — A&R
 Donte Dowlling — Engineer
 Jackson Dreyer — choir/chorus
 Tito Ebiwonjumi — choir/chorus
 Eddie Edwards — electric guitar
 Enaka Enyong — choir/chorus
 Jenna Lee Fair — choir/chorus
 Devin Feldman — engineer
 Carissa Fernald — choir/chorus
 Evan Fernald — piano
 Gavin Garris — choir/chorus
 Sam Gibson — mastering engineer, mixing
 Jayci Gorza — choir/chorus
 Natalie Grant — primary artist, vocals
 Olivia Grasso — choir/chorus
 Brad Guldemond — choir/chorus
 Baily Hager — choir/chorus
 Benjamin Hastings — primary artist, vocals
 Bernie Herms — Hammond B3
 Chelsea Howard — choir/chorus
 Briana Jean — vocals
 Kari Jobe — background vocals, primary artist, vocals
 Joel Okaah — choir/chorus
 Nicole Johnson — choir/chorus
 Ashley Jolley — choir/chorus
 Andrew Joseph — vocals
 Graham King — engineer
 Benji Kuriakose — choir/chorus
 Shantrice Laura — background vocals
 Tony Lucido — bass
 Christian Mason — choir/chorus
 Brenton Miles — background vocals, electric guitar, engineer
 Casey Moore — electric guitar
 Noah Moreno — choir/chorus
 Kittie Carreker Morgan — choir/chorus
 Tayler Moses — choir/chorus
 Angela Nasby — choir/chorus
 Amber Nealy — vocals
 Jack Nellis — engineer
 Christina Onstott — choir/chorus
 Jeff Pardo — keyboards, producer, programming
 Brady Pendergrass — choir/chorus
 Kelsei Peppars — choir/chorus
 Cory Pierce — electric guitar
 Jordyn Pierce — choir/chorus
 Edwin Portillo — choir/chorus
 Kyle Pruzina — choir/chorus
 Marci Pruzina — choir/chorus
 Dayanna Redic — vocals
 Aaron Robertson — keyboards, producer, programming, synthesizer
 Alyssa Rodriguez — choir/chorus
 Emily Ruff — choir/chorus
 Matt Sanders — choir/chorus
 Gilbert Sauceda — choir/chorus
 Rylee Scott — choir/chorus
 Setnick T. Sene — choir/chorus
 Sharon Okaah — choir/chorus
 Lydia Shaw — choir/chorus
 Sophie Shear — choir/chorus
 Kendall Smith — choir/chorus
 Zack Smith — choir/chorus
 Kelley Sparks — choir/chorus
 Blake Stafford — choir/chorus
 Cheryl Stark — choir/chorus
 Kirsten Strahley — choir/chorus
 Jordan Stribling — choir/chorus
 Keithon Stribling — background vocals
 Cody Sullivan — choir/chorus
 Bria Valderrama — choir/chorus
 Robby Valderrama — choir/chorus
 Doug Weier — mixing
 Mitch Wong — background vocals
 Steph Wong — choir/chorus
 Caleb Wood — vocals
 Shae Wooten — bass, synthesizer bass
 Ashley Wright — choir/chorus
 Daniella Young — background vocals, choir/chorus

Charts

Release history

References

External links
  on PraiseCharts

2022 live albums
Cody Carnes albums